The Medieval History Journal is a peer reviewed academic journal that aims to encompass the medieval world in scope.

The journal is published by SAGE Publications, India in association with the Medieval History Society and provides a space for comparative and transcultural conversations.

The journal is a member of the Committee on Publication Ethics (COPE).

Abstracting and indexing 
The Medieval History Journal is abstracted and indexed in:
 ProQuest: International Bibliography of the Social Sciences (IBSS)
 SCOPUS
 DeepDyve
 Portico
 Dutch-KB
 EBSCO
 OCLC
 Ohio
 Thomson Reuters: Arts & Humanities Citation Index
 J-Gate

References 

 COPE

External links 

 
 Homepage

SAGE Publishing academic journals
Publications established in 1998
History journals